The 2004 J&S Cup was a Tier II tennis event on the 2004 WTA Tour that run from April 26 - May 2, 2004. It was held in Warsaw, Poland, and was the 9th year that the event was staged. The 2003 J&S Cup finalist Venus Williams won her first Warsaw title and second overall of the year.

Entrants

Seeds

 Seedings are based on the rankings of April 19, 2004.
 Paola Suárez (no. 5 seed) withdrew from the tournament due to low back pain; Francesca Schiavone became the no. 9 seed.

Other entrants
The following players received wildcards into the main draw:

  Vera Douchevina
  Marta Domachowska

The following players received entry from the qualifying draw:

  Henrieta Nagyová
  Květa Peschke
  Kristen Schlukebir
  Elena Tatarkova

The following players received entry as lucky losers:
  Lenka Němečková

Finals

Singles

 Venus Williams defeated  Svetlana Kuznetsova, 6-1, 6-4

Doubles

 Silvia Farina Elia /  Francesca Schiavone defeated  Gisela Dulko /  Patricia Tarabini, 3-6, 6-2, 6-1

External links
WTA Profile
Singles, Doubles and Qualifying Singles Draws

JandS Cup
Warsaw Open
War